Ibrahim Abdel Meguid (born 2 December 1946) is an Egyptian novelist and author. His best-known works form the "Alexandria Trilogy": No One Sleeps in Alexandria, Birds of Amber, and Clouds Over Alexandria. These have been translated into English and French.

Early life and education
Meguid was born in Alexandria. He studied philosophy at Alexandria University. He obtained his BA in 1973 and moved to Cairo the following year.

Works 
 المسافات [Al-Masafât] (1983). Distant Train, translated by Hosam M. Aboul-Ela (2007)
بيت الياسمين [Bayt al-yasâmin] (1987). The House of Jasmine, trans. Noha Radwan (2012)
البلدة الأخرى [Al Balda al-ukhrâ] (1991). The Other Place, trans. Farouk Abdel Wahab (1997)
 لا أحد ينام في الإسكندرية [La Ahad yanam fil Iskandariya] (1996). No One Sleeps in Alexandria, trans. Farouk Abdel Wahab (2004)
 طيور العنبر [Toyour al-anbar] (2000). Birds of Amber, trans. Farouk Abdel Wahab (2005)
في كل أسبوع يوم جمعة [Fi koulli ousbou yawmou joumoua] (2009). Every Week Has a Friday
 الإسكندرية في غيمة [Iskandriya fi ghayma] (2012). Clouds Over Alexandria, trans. Kay Heikkinen (2019)

Awards and honors 
 1996 Naguib Mahfouz Medal, inaugural winner for The Other Place
1996 Cairo International Book Fair, novel of the year, for No One Sleeps in Alexandria
2011 Sawiris Cultural Award, for Every Week Has a Friday
 2015 Katara Prize for Arabic Novel, inaugural co-winner for Adagio

See also 
Rasha Adly
Radwa El Aswad
Ahmed Mourad

References

External links 
 Article by Ibrahim Abdel Meguid in Al-Ahram on the Egyptian revolution
 Article by Ibrahim Abdel Meguid in Al-Ahram on the cinema halls of Alexandria

1946 births
Living people
Writers from Alexandria
Egyptian novelists
Recipients of the Naguib Mahfouz Medal for Literature
Alexandria University alumni